James Hillhouse Fuertes (10 August 1863 in Ponce, Puerto Rico - 30 January 1932 in Brooklyn, New York) was a United States civil and sanitary engineer.

Biography
He was the son of astronomer and civil engineer Estevan Fuertes and Mary Stone Perry Fuertes, and the brother of naturalist and writer Louis Agassiz Fuertes.  Fuertes graduated from Cornell University in 1883. He constructed works for the sewerage, drainage and water supply of various cities in the United States, Canada and Brazil, and served as consulting engineer of various corporations and municipalities. He was a non-resident lecturer at Cornell.

Works
 Water and Public Health (1897)
 Water Filtration Works (1901)
 "European Sanitary Engineering Series" in the Engineering Record
He also wrote numerous monographs on engineering and sanitary subjects, etc.

Family
He married Mary Hill Cable on 10 January 1895. She died in May 1921 in Brooklyn.

References

External links
 

1863 births
1932 deaths
American civil engineers
American people of Puerto Rican descent
Cornell University alumni
Cornell University faculty
Hispanic and Latino American teachers